Linochitina is an extinct genus of chitinozoans. It was described by Alfred Eisenack in 1968. It contains a single species, Linochitina odiosa.

References

Prehistoric marine animals
Fossil taxa described in 1968